Abbasabad was a fortress of strategic importance for the defense of the Nakhichevan Khanate.

It was built with the help of French engineers by Abbas Mirza in 1810.  He appointed Ehsan Khan Kangarlu as commander of the fortress in 1827, during the Russo-Persian War of 1826–1828. During a siege by the Russians, Ehsan Khan secretly arranged for the gates of the fortress to be opened to the Russian commander General Ivan Paskevich on 22 July 1827.

During the Russian rule the fortress was abandoned and fell into ruin. The ruins remained until 1970s, when they were buried under the water during construction of the Aras water reservoir.

References

External links 

 No. 6497 Agreement concerning the settlement of frontier and financial questions (with Protocols and annexes). Signed at Tehran, on 2 December 1954

19th century in Azerbaijan
Russo-Persian Wars
Persian-Caucasian architecture
Military history of Qajar Iran
1810 establishments in Asia
19th-century establishments in Iran
Qajar castles